Debra Marie Sariñana is an American educator and politician serving as a member of the New Mexico House of Representatives from the 21st district, which includes a portion of Bernalillo County.

Early life and education
Sariñana was born and raised in Albuquerque, New Mexico and graduated from Manzano High School in 1978. She earned a Bachelor of Science degree in education from New Mexico State University in 1983 and a Master of Arts in mathematics education from the University of New Mexico in 2007.

Career
Sariñana served in the United States Air Force Reserves from 1984 to 1990 as a medical service specialist. Prior to entering politics, she was a math teacher at Manzano High School. In the November 8, 2016 Democratic primary for the 21st district of the New Mexico House of Representatives, Sariñana defeated incumbent Idalia Lechuga-Tena. She took office in January 2017.

References

External links
Campaign website 
  

Year of birth missing (living people)
Living people
21st-century American women
Hispanic and Latino American state legislators in New Mexico
Hispanic and Latino American women in politics
Democratic Party members of the New Mexico House of Representatives
New Mexico State University alumni
University of New Mexico alumni
Politicians from Albuquerque, New Mexico
United States Air Force airmen
United States Air Force reservists